Maria de Lourdes Mazzoleni Portela (born 14 January 1988) is a Brazilian middleweight judoka. She won bronze medals at the 2011 and 2015 Pan American Games, and competed at the 2012 and 2016 Olympics.  At the 2012 Olympics, she lost her first match to Yuri Alvear.  At the 2016 Games, she beat Assmaa Niang in the first round, before losing to Bernadette Graf in the second.

In 2020, she won the gold medal in the women's 70 kg event at the 2020 Pan American Judo Championships held in Guadalajara, Mexico. The following year, Portela represented Brazil at the 2020 Summer Olympics. She competed in the women's 70 kg event, being controversially eliminated in the second round against Madina Taimazova, in a ten-minute golden score overtime where one hit that would have given Portela a win was dismissed by the referees, and also was part of the mixed team competition.

References

External links

 
 

Judoka at the 2011 Pan American Games
Judoka at the 2012 Summer Olympics
Judoka at the 2016 Summer Olympics
Olympic judoka of Brazil
Living people
1988 births
Brazilian female judoka
Pan American Games bronze medalists for Brazil
Pan American Games medalists in judo
Judoka at the 2015 Pan American Games
Medalists at the 2015 Pan American Games
Medalists at the 2011 Pan American Games
Judoka at the 2020 Summer Olympics
Sportspeople from Rio Grande do Sul
21st-century Brazilian women